Nguyễn Xuân Khoát (Hanoi, 11 February 1910 – 1993) was a Vietnamese pianist and song composer. He was the first president of the Vietnam Composers' Association, and posthumously in 1996 was a recipient of the Hồ Chí Minh Prize.

References 

 NGUYỄN XUÂN KHOÁT (1910-1994) tiểu sử

People from Hanoi
Vietnamese composers
Vietnamese pianists
Vietnamese animators
1910 births
1993 deaths
Ho Chi Minh Prize recipients
20th-century pianists
20th-century composers